The 1971 Akron Zips football team represented Akron University in the 1971 NCAA College Division football season as an independent. Led by 11th-year head coach Gordon K. Larson, the Zips played their home games at the Rubber Bowl in Akron, Ohio. They finished the season with a record of 8–2 and outscored their opponents 193–119.

Schedule

References

Akron
Akron Zips football seasons
Akron Zips football